Trichosteresis is a genus of Megaspilid wasps in the family Megaspilidae. There are at least three described species in Trichosteresis.

Species
These three species belong to the genus Trichosteresis:
 Trichosteresis floridanus Ashmead
 Trichosteresis glabra (Boheman, 1832)
 Trichosteresis nudipennis Kieffer, 1907

References

Parasitic wasps
Articles created by Qbugbot
Ceraphronoidea